Charlotte FitzGerald-de Ros, 20th Baroness de Ros of Helmsley (24 May 1769 – 9 January 1831), also known as Lady Henry FitzGerald, was born Charlotte Boyle-Walsingham in Castlemartyr, County Cork, Ireland or in London, where she died.

She was the daughter of the Hon. Robert Boyle, later Boyle-Walsingham (1736–1780) and wife (m. 1759) Charlotte Hanbury Williams (d. 1790), daughter of Sir Charles Hanbury Williams and Lady Frances Coningsby. Her paternal grandparents were Henry Boyle, 1st Earl of Shannon and his second wife Lady Henrietta Boyle.

She spent most of her childhood with her parents at the Boyle Farm mansion in Thames Ditton. (Her mother, the second daughter of Frances Coningsby, had bought this estate in 1784 from Lord Hertford, who was grieving over the death of his wife there two years earlier.) Charlotte did much artistic decoration in Boyle Farm and much of it has survived to the present day.

In London on 3/4 August 1791, more than a year after her mother's death, Charlotte married Lord Henry FitzGerald, a member of the Duke of Leinster's family. After petitioning King George III in 1790, she eventually (in 1806) was able to end the abeyance to the Barony of de Ros, the most ancient baronial title in England, in her favour — even though there were two other co-heirs to the barony, and she had only a quarter interest; another claimant, Sir Henry Hunloke, 4th Bt., had a half interest and was the heir general of the elder of the two sisters from whom the claims were derived. No clear explanation for the award was given by the House of Lords except an inference that Charlotte came from (or at least had married into) a better family. Charlotte legally changed her name by Royal Licence on 6 October of the same year to Charlotte FitzGerald-de Ros. Members of the de Ros family lived in Thames Ditton for a long while. They had links with the brightest of society, from the Duke of Wellington downwards. Henry's younger brother was the notorious Lord Edward FitzGerald. 

Charlotte died on 9 January 1831.

References

 
 

|-

21
1769 births
1831 deaths
People from Thames Ditton
History of Surrey
Hereditary women peers
Boyle family